Lu Yusong (born February 6, 1992) is a Chinese baseball pitcher who plays with the Henan Elephants in the China Baseball League.

Lu represented China at the 2017 World Baseball Classic and 2018 Asian Games.

References

1992 births
Living people
Asian Games competitors for China
Baseball pitchers
Baseball players at the 2018 Asian Games
Chinese expatriate baseball players in the United States
Henan Elephants players
Texas AirHogs players
2017 World Baseball Classic players